Iluminatti (stylized in tall man lettering: IlumiNATTI) is the debut studio album by Dominican singer Natti Natasha, released by Pina Records and Sony Music Latin on 15 February 2019. The album has spawned four singles: "Quién Sabe", "Me Gusta", "Pa' Mala Yo" and "Oh Daddy". Iluminatti debuted at number three on the US Top Latin Albums chart with 7,000 album-equivalent units, making it the biggest opening week for a Latin album by a woman since Shakira's El Dorado.
After the album's release, "Te Lo Dije", "Obsesión", "Oh Daddy" and "No Voy a Llorar" were released as following-up singles with music videos.
In June, Natti released a music video of her tenth single "Deja Tus Besos".

Background
Natasha announced that her album would be titled ilumiNATTI and was set for release on 15 February 2019. In an interview with Billboard, Natasha described the album as an album to empower women, bring love and light to the world. In the interview, Natasha explains the origin of the album's name, ilumiNATTI, and felt that it was right as "ilumi" means light, and added Natti as it is her stage name.

Prior to the album's release, Natasha teased on her personal Instagram account new songs, such as "Era Necesario", "Deja Tus Besos", and "Obsession".

On 2 February 2019, Natasha joined Puerto Rican singer Kany García at the Soy Yo Tour to perform "Soy Mia" at the José Miguel Agrelot Coliseum.

Singles
The album's first official single, "Quién Sabe", was released on 21 June 2018. The second and third singles, "Me Gusta" and "Lamento Tu Perdida" were released in December 2018. The fourth single, "Pa' Mala Yo", was released on 11 January 2019. "La Mejor Version de Mi" was released as fifth single and "Te Lo Dije" as sixth single in February 2019.
On 22 March was released the single "Obsesión" and in April was released "Oh Daddy".
On May 31, 2019, Natasha released the music video for her ninth single "No Voy a Llorar".
In June 2019, Natti announced on her official Instagram account that "Deja Tus Besos" would be remixed and released as the final single off ilumiNATTI alongside Puerto Rican singer Chencho Corleone.

Track listing

Notes
 "Oh Daddy" contains an interpolation from "Donna" by Ritchie Valens.
 Writing credits adapted from Warner/Chappell Music.
 Production credits adapted from the album liner notes.

Charts

Weekly charts

Year-end charts

Certifications

References

2019 debut albums
Natti Natasha albums
Pina Records albums
Sony Music Latin albums
Spanish-language albums